Valdgale parish is situated in Talsi Municipality in Latvia. It is located approximately 13 km from the city of Talsi, 4 km from Valdemārpils and 20 km from Dundaga. The centre of Valdgale parish is called , from where it is about 5 km to the birthplace of the renowned Krišjānis Valdemārs. Valdgale has its own elementary school, shops, local authority building and more.

References 

Parishes of Latvia
Talsi Municipality